Phil, Phillip, or Philip Jackson may refer to:

Sportsmen
Phil Jackson (rugby league, born 1932), British rugby league back during 1950s
Phil Jackson (born 1945), American basketball player and coach in NBA
Phil Jackson (rugby league 1970s), British rugby league forward during 1970s
Phil Jackson (boxer) (born 1964), American heavyweight boxer

Others
Philip Jackson (surveyor) (1802–1879), British Royal Navy lieutenant and mapmaker during 1820s
Philip L. Jackson (1893–1953), publisher of Portland newspaper The Oregon Journal
Philip Jackson (sculptor) (born 1944), Scottish sculptor
Philip Jackson (actor) (born 1948), English actor

See also
Phil Jackson Ibargüen (born 1985), Colombian footballer
Jackson (surname)